Timothy Smith is an American psychologist, currently Distinguished Professor at University of Utah.

References

Year of birth missing (living people)
Living people
University of Utah faculty
21st-century American psychologists
University of Kansas alumni